Yesugei Baghatur or Yesükhei (Modern Mongolian: Есүхэй баатар, Yesukhei baatar,) (b. 1134 – d. 1171) was a major chief of the Khamag Mongol confederation and the father of Temüjin, later known as Genghis Khan. He was from the Borjigin family, and his name literally means "like nine", meaning he had the auspicious qualities of the number nine, a lucky number to the Mongols.

Life 

Yesügei was the son of Bartan Baghatur, who was the second son of Khabul Khan. Khabul was recognized as a khagan by the Jin Dynasty. Khabul Khan was, in turn, the great grandson of the Mongol chief Khaidu, the first to try to unite all of the Mongols. Yesügei's first and chief wife, Hoelun, a daughter of the Olkhunut forest people, was abducted by Yesügei with help of his elder brother Negün Taishi and younger brother Daritai Otchigin, from her newlywed husband Chiledu of Merkits. Yesügei abducted Hoelun because of her beauty and physical indications of fertility.

After the Khamag Mongol confederation khan Hotula died, the confederation had no elected king, but de facto Yesügei ruled the confederation. Yesügei had a bloodbrother, or anda, Toghrul Khan (later known as Wang Khan and Ong Khan). Yesügei helped Toghrul to defeat his uncle Gurkhan. After Yesügei's death, Toghrul initially helped Temüjin in arranging his marriage to Börte and uniting the tribes, but later defected to Genghis' anda and rival, Jamukha.

In 1171 Yesügei died when his son Temüjin was nine years old. The Secret History of the Mongols records that he was poisoned by Tatars while sharing a meal at a wedding on the way home after leaving his son Temüjin at home of Dai Setsen, a noble man of Khongirad tribe, when two fathers, Yesügei and Dai Setsen, agreed that their children, Temüjin and Börte, would marry in the future. 

When Yesügei was on his way home after leaving Temüjin with Börte's family, he noticed an encampment where the Tatars were celebrating a feast. The Secret History explains that he wanted to join their feast, but he knew he can not reveal his real identity since he was known, among the Tatars, as the person who killed their relative (called Temüjin Uge) in a battle eight years earlier. Yesügei tried his luck but someone recognized him and offered him poisoned food under the guise of hospitality. Although quite ill, Yesügei managed to escape back to his family's camp.

Yesügei died three days later at home with presence of this family and servants.

Legacy 
During reign of Yuan dynasty, he was given temple name of Liezu and posthumous name Shenyuan Huangdi.

Family 
Yesügei and Hoelun had four sons Temüjin, (later known as Genghis Khan), Hasar, Hachiun, Temüge and a daughter, Temülen. Yesugei had two sons by his second wife Sochigel: Behter and Belgutei. The Secret History of the Mongols records that in his youth Temüjin killed his brother Behter in a fight for food. His other half-brother, Belgutei, however was a good friend, and later became a general under Genghis.

See also 

 Bride kidnapping
 Yesu (disambiguation)Yesu – several people of that name
 Yesü Möngke

References

External links 

1130s births
1171 deaths
Year of birth uncertain
Yesugei
Genghis Khan
Mongol Empire people
Tengrist monarchs